Children's Wisconsin (formerly Children's Hospital of Wisconsin) is a nationally ranked, freestanding, 298-bed, pediatric acute care children's hospital located in Milwaukee, Wisconsin. It is affiliated with the Medical College of Wisconsin and is a member of the Children's Wisconsin health system, one of two of the children's hospitals in the system. The hospital provides comprehensive pediatric specialties and subspecialties to infants, children, teens, and young adults aged 0–21 throughout the Wisconsin region. The hospital features an ACS verified level I pediatric trauma center, one of two in the state. Its regional pediatric intensive-care unit and neonatal intensive care units serve the region. The hospital also has a rooftop helipad for critical pediatric transport.

The hospital consists of two campuses, the main campus is located in Milwaukee and a second campus is located in the Fox Cities.

History 
The hospital was originally established as Milwaukee Children's Hospital on March 16, 1894. Three months later, it became known as Children's Free Hospital. In 1985, the hospital became known as Children's Hospital of Wisconsin. The hospital provides primary care, specialty care, urgent care, emergency care, community health services, foster and adoption services, child and family counseling, child advocacy services and family resource centers.

In November 2020, Dwayne "The Rock" Johnson collaborated with Microsoft and billionaire Bill Gates to donate Xbox Series X consoles to Children's Wisconsin along with 19 other children's hospitals throughout the country.

In addition to the Milwaukee location, there is a second location in Neenah, Wisconsin, on the campus of ThedaCare Regional Medical Center-Neenah which serves the Appleton, Green Bay, and Oshkosh metro areas.

Children's Wisconsin was ranked No. 4 in the nation by Parents magazine in its March 2013 issue. The hospital's Neonatal Intensive Care Unit was highlighted by Time magazine for its exceptional care for preemies.

Awards 
As of 2022, Children's Wisconsin has placed nationally in eight ranked pediatric specialties on U.S. News & World Report. The publication also ranked the hospital as the #1 children's hospital in Wisconsin.

See also 
 Froedtert Hospital
 Medical College of Wisconsin
 List of children's hospitals in the United States

References

External links 
 
 

1894 establishments in Wisconsin
Buildings and structures in Milwaukee County, Wisconsin
Children's hospitals in the United States
Hospital buildings completed in 1894
Hospitals established in 1894
Hospitals in Wisconsin
Pediatric trauma centers